Ralph Bigland (29 January 1712 – 27 March 1784) was an English officer of arms, antiquarian and cheesemaker. He was born at Stepney, Middlesex, and was the only son of Richard Bigland and his wife, Mary. His father was a native of Westmorland, descended from the Bigland family of Biglands.  He should not be confused with his nephew Sir Ralph Bigland.

Early career
In 1728 Bigland was apprenticed within the Tallow Chandlers' Company to a cheesemaker. He was made free of the company in 1737 and served as its master in 1772. He was based in London but his occupation took him to the Low Countries and Leith in Scotland. The War of the Austrian Succession brought him to Flanders, where he supplied cheese to the allied armies. While he was working at this profession, his antiquarian interests were already evident.

Antiquarian and heraldic interests

Much of Bigland's antiquarian work was focused on Gloucestershire. Over time, he travelled the whole county, accumulating historical information and making it his business to record the inscriptions on everything from great monuments to modest gravestones. Following his death, his son, Richard, attempted to bring the work to print as a county history, under the editorship of James Dallaway. A number of instalments of the Historical, Monumental, and Genealogical Collections relative to the County of Gloucester were published between 1786 and 1794 (completing two volumes, dated 1791 and 1794), and further instalments appeared sporadically through the 19th century. However, the project remained unfinished until a definitive edition was published in four volumes by the Bristol and Gloucestershire Archaeological Society between 1989 and 1995.

Bigland's antiquarian concerns brought about a change of career in 1757. In that year, he was appointed Bluemantle Pursuivant of Arms in Ordinary at the College of Arms. He was promoted to the office of Somerset Herald of Arms in Ordinary in 1759. He was a skilled draftsman, and he was a methodical genealogist. He advocated the inclusion of much greater detail in church registers and called for better safekeeping and detailed indexing of such records. Along with his friend and colleague Sir Isaac Heard, he helped to reestablish the College of Arms as the center of genealogical study in England. Bigland climbed steadily in the heraldic hierarchy and was a king of arms for the last eleven years of his life. He became Norroy King of Arms in 1773, Clarenceux King of Arms in 1774, and Garter Principal King of Arms in 1780.

Bigland was working until his demise when he died in his rooms in the College of Arms on 27 March 1784. He was buried on 8 April in Gloucester Cathedral. Practising what he preached, he had himself drafted the inscription, which contains a quantity of genealogical information.

Arms

See also
Heraldry

References
Citations

Bibliography
L. Campbell and Francis Steer. A Catalogue of Manuscripts in the College of Arms Collections. (London, 1988).
John Anstis. The Register of the Most Noble Order of the Garter. (London, 1724), 376–379.
E. F. M. Prince, Ralph Bigland and his kin (1989), Coll. Arms
I. Gray, Ralph Bigland and his family, Transactions of the Bristol and Gloucestershire Archaeological Society, 75 (1956), 116–33
J. Goodall, Garter Bigland's funeral, 1784, Coat of Arms, new ser., 9 (1991–2), 40–42
A. R. Wagner, The records and collections of the College of Arms (1952)
Walter H. Godfrey and Sir Anthony Wagner, The College of Arms, Queen Victoria Street: being the sixteenth and final monograph of the London Survey Committee. (London, 1963).
Sir Anthony Wagner. Heralds of England: a History of the Office and College of Arms. (London, 1967).
Sir Anthony Wagner. Heralds and Heraldry in the Middle Ages. (London, 1956).
Mark Noble. A History of the College of Arms. (London, 1805), 137–42.

External links
The College of Arms
Heraldic List of Officers of Arms

1712 births
1784 deaths
18th-century antiquarians
English antiquarians
English genealogists
English officers of arms
Garter Principal Kings of Arms
Burials at Gloucester Cathedral
Historians of Gloucestershire